Fiona Compton (born 1981) is a London-based artist and historian from Saint Lucia.

Biography 
Compton is one of the five children of politician John Compton and Janice Barbara Compton. She is the Goddaughter of King Charles III. In 2013, her youngest sister Nina Compton finished second and was voted as "fan favourite" on American reality cooking show Top Chef.

Compton works for publishing houses in the UK, taking photographs of European officials in the finance and banking industries. She is an ambassador for Notting Hill Carnival, a two-day festival in London.

References 

British people of Saint Lucian descent
1981 births
Living people
British women photographers
Saint Lucian women